Kersantin poika is a 1971 novel by Finnish author Veijo Meri. It won the Nordic Council's Literature Prize in 1973.

References

1971 novels
20th-century Finnish novels
Finnish-language novels
Nordic Council's Literature Prize-winning works